The Geraldton Buccaneers, also known as the Buccs, are an Australian basketball team based in Geraldton, Western Australia. The Buccaneers compete in the Men's NBL1 West and play their home games at Activewest Stadium. The team is affiliated with Geraldton Amateur Basketball Association (GABA), the major administrative basketball organisation in the region.

Team history

Establishment
In the 1980s, the highest level of basketball in the state of Western Australia was played in the Perth-based District Competition. In an effort to expand the league, the Western Australian Basketball Federation began approaching various business people in the country areas to gauge their interest in a statewide basketball competition. Among those approached were Brian Middleton and Graham Greenaway, residents of Geraldton. Middleton and Greenaway convinced Kevin Jones, the Administrator of the Geraldton Amateur Basketball Association (GABA), to join them in establishing a basketball team in Geraldton. With Jones leading the project, Middleton and Greenaway provided funding for the licence and became the team's private owners. They served as the licencees until the GABA eventually bought the rights to the team. Geraldton was joined by Albany and Bunbury, and then Kalgoorlie and Mandurah.

Early success
1989 saw the formation of the State Basketball League (SBL). Initially known as the Batavia Buccaneers, the team's inaugural coaching staff included Head Coach Tom McClain, a former player for the Perth Wildcats, and his two assistants, Kevin Jones and Jim O'Dea. Americans Dan Hunt and Brian Funingsland were the team's first two import players, while Perth native Ray Chamberlain joined the squad. All three players were members of the East Perth Eagles' 1988 premiership team. The Buccaneers finished their inaugural season as minor premiers, earning first place on the standings with a 19–3 record. They defeated the Willetton Tigers 106–93 in the semi-finals before losing 114–89 to the Perth Redbacks in the SBL Grand Final.

In 1993, the Buccaneers won their second minor premiership after finishing the regular season in first place with a 19–5 record. In 1996, they made their first grand final appearance since 1989, where they lost 103–86 to the Bunbury City Slammers. In 1997, they returned to the SBL Grand Final, where they lost 94–92 to the Perth Redbacks.

In 2000, the Buccaneers finished on top of the West Conference table with a league-best 17–2 record. They made it through to their fourth SBL Grand Final, where behind a 30-point effort from Greg Brown, they defeated the Lakeside Lightning 96–76 to win their maiden championship. Alongside Brown, Canadian forward Jeff Bevington had 25 points and 15 rebounds while Daniel McGlynn had 18 points. The following season, the Buccs made their fifth grand final appearance in 13 years, but despite a 30-point effort from Bevington, they were defeated 101–83 by the Perry Lakes Hawks.

Sixth grand final appearance
The Buccaneers played in the finals every year throughout the 2000s. In 2011, they missed the finals for the first time since 1998. They again missed the finals in 2012 before returning to form in 2013 with a playoff appearance.

Following their revival in 2013, the Buccaneers headed into the 2014 season not settling for anything less than a championship. Behind imports Carter Cook and Jerrah Young, as well as former Melbourne Tigers player Bennie Lewis and veterans Aaron Ralph, Mat Wundenberg and Luke Wrensted, the Buccaneers claimed their first minor premiership since 2000 with a 19–7 record. They went on to beat the South West Slammers and Lakeside Lightning in four straight playoff matches to reach their first SBL Grand Final since 2001. However, they came up short in the championship decider as they were defeated 99–83 by the East Perth Eagles. The Buccaneers had now won just the one championship from six grand final appearances.

Early finals exits
In 2015, the Buccaneers remained in the mix for top championship contenders as they finished the regular season in second place with a 20–6 record. Despite their impressive season and boasting a roster that included Carter Cook, Bennie Lewis, Aaron Ralph, Daniel Thomas and Cory Cooperwood, the Buccaneers were outclassed by the seventh-seeded Goldfields Giants in the quarter-finals, losing the series 2–0.

Despite losing Bennie Lewis for the 2016 season, the Buccaneers were able to cover his loss by acquiring Matthew Adekponya and Jackson Hussey, while also signing Maurice Barrow to complement four-year import Carter Cook. They went on to lead the Buccs to a fourth-place finish with an 18–8 record, before advancing to the semi-finals where they were swept by the eventual champion Cockburn Cougars.

The 2017 season started off well for the Buccaneers, as they went 6–1 over the first seven games. The Buccs' early-season form demonstrated their ability to cover all areas, with imports Maurice Barrow and Dwayne Benjamin tremendously versatile, Mat Wundenberg and James Paringatai experienced bigs, Jackson Hussey and Matt Hancock a strong back court, and Aaron Ralph a sharpshooter off the bench. They went on to finish the regular season in third place with a 19–7 record before reaching the semi-finals, where they were defeated 2–1 by the Joondalup Wolves despite taking the first game.

There was a mass turnover in the playing stocks for the Buccaneers leading into 2018, with Benjamin and Hancock moving on, while Hussey and Barrow also departed to join the defending champion Perth Redbacks. As a result, they picked up imports Gokul Natesan and Colter Lasher, to go with Marcus Alipate of Tonga and Earnest Ross of Guam. With a 23–3 record in 2018, the Buccaneers won their first minor premiership since 2014. It also marked the Buccs' best regular-season record since 2001, when they finished second at 24–2. They went on to lose to the eighth-seeded Rockingham Flames in straight sets in the quarter-finals.

Second championship
The Buccaneers retained the services of import Colter Lasher for the 2019 season, while losing Natesan and Ross. Initial import Willie Conner was replaced mid-season by DeAngelo Isby, who himself was later released during the quarter-finals. The Buccaneers finished the regular season in third place with a 19–7 record, and after two three-game playoff series, they reached the SBL Grand Final. In what was their seventh championship decider, the Buccaneers defeated the Joondalup Wolves 92–80 to win their second championship.

NBL1 West
In 2021, the SBL was rebranded as NBL1 West. In 2022, the Buccaneers reached their eighth grand final, where they were defeated by the Rockingham Flames 91–79.

Players

Notable past players

 Matthew Adekponya
 Shamus Ballantyne
 Maurice Barrow
 Everard Bartlett
 Dwayne Benjamin
 Jeff Bevington
 Eric Brand
 Greg Brown
 Bryce Burch
 Carter Cook
 Cory Cooperwood
 Alan Erickson
 Ray Evans
 Brian Fundingsland
 Mark Heron
/ Dan Hunt
 Rob Kampman
 Michael Lay
/ Bennie Lewis
 Curtis Marshall
 Luke Meyer
/ Mathiang Muo
 Joe Regnier
 Earnest Ross
 Daniel Thomas
 Jerrah Young
/ Ryan Zamroz

Accolades
Championships: 2 (2000, 2019)
Grand Final appearances: 8 (1989, 1996, 1997, 2000, 2001, 2014, 2019, 2022)
Minor premierships: 6 (1989, 1993, 2000, 2014, 2018, 2022)

Women's team
For a brief period during the 2000s, a Geraldton Buccaneers women's team competed in the WSBL. In four seasons between 2005 and 2008, the Lady Buccs posted an 18–72 record (.200 winning percentage).

References

External links
Official team website

1989 establishments in Australia
Basketball teams established in 1989
Basketball teams in Western Australia
Geraldton
NBL1 West teams